Baiso is an Afro-Asiatic language spoken in Ethiopia, in the region around Lake Abaya. It is an unwritten language.

Phonology 
The following sounds are used in the Baiso language:

References

Further reading 

 Brenzinger, Matthias. 1999. The "islanders" of Lake Abaya and Lake Ch'amo: Harro, Ganjule, Gats'ame and Bayso. SIL Electronic Survey Reports. 36pp.
 Corbett, Greville G. and Hayward, Richard J. 1987. Gender and number in Bayso. Lingua 73. 1-28.
 Epple, Susanne. 2016. The Bayso people of Gidiccho Island, Southern Ethiopia: An ethnographic sketch. Ms. 62pp.
 Hayward, Richard J. 1978, 1979. Bayso Revisited: some preliminary linguistic observations. Bulletin of the School of Oriental and African Studies 41, 42. 539-570, 103-132.
 Lemmi Kebebew Gnarie. 2018. Grammatical Description and Documentation of Bayso. (Doctoral dissertation, Addis Ababa University; 283pp.)

Omo–Tana languages
Ethiopian culture